Stuart Rowley (born 12 May 1967) is a British engineer, and was the head of Ford of Europe between April 2019 and Decemeber 2022.

Early life
He was born in Derbyshire. He grew up in a Staffordshire village. He studied Mineral Engineering at the University of Leeds.

Career

Ford
He joined Ford of Britain in 1990.

Personal life
He is married with two sons.

References

1967 births
Alumni of the University of Leeds
British manufacturing chief executives
Ford of Europe
Ford executives
People from Staffordshire
Living people